This article concerns the period 49 BC – 40 BC.

Significant people
 Julius Caesar, Roman dictator (lived 100–44 BC, term 46–44 BC)
 Marcus Junius Brutus, Roman politician (85–42 BC)
 Mark Antony, Roman politician and general (83–30 BC)
 Pharaoh Cleopatra VII of Egypt (lived 70/69–30 BC, reigned 51–30 BC)—enters her twenties, has son Caesarion with Julius Caesar, before meeting Mark Antony
 Gaius Iulius Caesar Octavianus, Roman politician and general (62 BC–AD 14)
 Pharaoh Ptolemy XV Caesarion (lived 47–30 BC, reigned 44–30 BC)
 Gaius Cassius Longinus, Roman politician (died 42 BC)

References